The Downey Studios was a production studio in Downey, California.
The studio featured  of indoor and outdoor production space including a  building and a  building which was home of the largest indoor water tank in North America. A suburban residential street backlot built especially for Christmas with the Kranks, with 5 complete homes and 11 facades, was also available at the studio.

The studios were created out of the former Rockwell International plant where the Space Shuttle orbiters as well as some vehicles for the Apollo space program were assembled. The studios occupied only a portion of the former plant with the Downey Landing shopping complex, a Kaiser Permanente hospital, a park, and Columbia Memorial Space Center museum taking up the remainder of the space.

In October 2012 demolition of Downey Studios had begun. The Promenade at Downey retail power center is located on the site today.

TV and film credits

 Iron Man 2 (2010)
 Deep in the Valley (2009)
 Couples Retreat (2009)
 G.I. Joe: The Rise of Cobra (2009)
 Indiana Jones and the Kingdom of the Crystal Skull (2008)
 Iron Man (2008)
 Pineapple Express (2008)
 Cloverfield (2008)
 Top Gear (2008)
 The No Sit List (2008)
 Zodiac (2007)
 Charlie Wilson's War (2007)
 Smash Lab (2007)
 Yo Gabba Gabba!, Season 1, 2007, Season 3, 2009
 The Santa Clause 3: The Escape Clause (2006)
 The Prestige (2006)
 Déjà Vu (2006)
 Smokin' Aces (2006)
 Free Ride (2006)
 The Slaughterhouse Massacre (2005)
 The Island (2005)
 Fun with Dick and Jane (2005)
 Van Helsing (2004)
 Lemony Snicket's A Series of Unfortunate Events (2004)
 Christmas with the Kranks (2004)
 In Enemy Hands (2004)
 The Italian Job (2003)
 Terminator 3: Rise of the Machines (2003)
 Daredevil (2003)
 Clockstoppers (2002)
 Catch Me If You Can (2002)
 Spider-Man (2002)
 Space Cowboys (2000)
 Life (1999)
 Can't Hardly Wait (1998)

Music Videos
 "Alejandro" - Lady Gaga (2009)
 "White & Nerdy" - "Weird Al" Yankovic (2010)
 “Otis” - Kanye West (2011)
 "Famous Last Words" - My Chemical Romance (2006)
 "Welcome To The Black Parade" - My Chemical Romance (2006)

References

External links
Downey Studios website

IMDb Profile
Columbia Memorial Space Center — near former site.

Mass media companies established in 1998
Mass media companies disestablished in 2012
Defunct American film studios
Downey, California
Buildings and structures demolished in 2012
Demolished buildings and structures in California